George Washington Middle School in Alexandria, Virginia, is located at 1005 Mount Vernon Avenue, part of Alexandria City Public Schools. Named after the nation's first president, it originally opened in 1935 as a high school; it consolidated the city's two previous schools, Alexandria and George Mason. The Tulloch Memorial Gym was built in 1952. As many as nine classes at a time are now held each period in the gym or the classrooms connected to it. In 1971, the city's school district moved to a 6-2-2-2 configuration, and reassigned its three high schools from four-year to two-year campuses. The newest, T.C. Williams, took all of the city's juniors and seniors, while Francis C. Hammond and George Washington split the freshmen and sophomores. Both became junior high schools in 1979, with grades 7–9, and middle schools in 1993, with grades 6–8.

Beginning in the 2009–2010 school year, both were split into several smaller schools with George Washington split into the two schools, George Washington 1 and George Washington 2 and Francis C. Hammond split into Francis C. Hammond 1, 2, and 3. Superintendent Morton Sherman believes that smaller schools will provide, "...personalization, engagement,
and customization for higher levels of achievement for all students." However, this change was later revoked, and George Washington and Francis Hammond are both united schools now. Both middle schools also began to follow the International Baccalaureate Middle Years Programme curriculum. This was also changed, and now only Jefferson-Houston School follows the International Baccalaureate Middle Years Programme curriculum.

Demographics
(as of 9/5/2017) 	                      
Enrollment 	                              1392+
African American 	                       21%
Hispanic 	                               33% 
White 	                                       41% 	
Other 	                                       5% (Asian, Pacific Islander, American Indian)

AFL preseason game
In 1965, GWHS hosted a pre-season American Football League game on August 7, between the New York Jets and Houston Oilers. It was a charity benefit sponsored by Kena Temple, the local Shriners organization, and was wrapped into the city's annual "Alexandria Days" summer festival,—and was known for being the professional debut of Joe Namath.

Notable alumni
 Francis Hammond, class of 1949, posthumously awarded the Medal of Honor in 1953 for his actions during the Korean War. A new high school in Alexandria was named for him in 1956, now a middle school
 Willard Scott of NBC's The Today Show, class of 1951
 John Phillips, the Mamas & the Papas, class of 1953
 Cass Elliot, the Mamas & the Papas, class of 1961
 Jim Morrison of the Doors, class of 1961
 Guy Gardner, astronaut, class of 1965
 Skeeter Swift, pro basketball player, class of 1965

References

External links

George Washington High School - nostalgic site

Public middle schools in Virginia
Educational institutions established in 1935
Schools in Alexandria, Virginia
1935 establishments in Virginia